The 59th edition of the Vuelta a Colombia was held from June 6 to June 21, 2009. Stage nine was cancelled due to a landslide.

Stages

2009-06-06: Bogotá — Bogotá (7.6 km)

2009-06-07: Bogotá — Bogotá (85.9 km)

2009-06-08: Mosquera — Ibagué (184.4 km)

2009-06-09: Ibagué — Ibagué (128.2 km)

2009-06-10: Circasia — Cali (195.5 km)

2009-06-11: Guacari — Cartago (146.8 km)

2009-06-12: Santa Rosa de Cabal — Sabaneta (177.8 km)

2009-06-14: Medellín — Medellín (35 km)

2009-06-15: Rionegro — El Escobero (119.5 km)

2009-06-16: Caldas — Manizales (167.2 km) 
 Stage cancelled due to a landslide

2009-06-17: Manizales — Guaduas (167.3 km)

2009-06-18: Guaduas — Zipaquirá (141.8 km)

2009-06-19: Ubaté — Tunja (158.7 km)

2009-06-20: Tunja — Bogotá (142.5 km)

2009-06-21: La Calera — Bogotá (23.1 km)

Jersey progression

Final classification

Teams 

Une-Epm

 Director Deportivo: Raúl Mesa

Rock Racing

 Director Deportivo: Rudy Pevenage

Lotería de Boyacá

 Director Deportivo: Ángel Camargo

Colombia es Pasión — Café de Colombia

 Director Deportivo: Luis Saldarriaga

Gobernación del Zulia

 Director Deportivo: Hernán Alemán

Indeportes Antioquia — Idea-Fla

 Director Deportivo: Carlos Jaramillo

EBSA

 Director Deportivo: Rafael Antonio Niño

Lotería del Táchira

 Director Deportivo: Roberto Sánchez

Para Tunja lo Mejor

 Director Deportivo: Jairo Sierra

Néctar-Coldeportes-Cundinamarca.

 Director Deportivo: Raùl Gómez

GW-Chec

 Director Deportivo: Luís Cely

Indervalle

 Director Deportivo: William Palacios

Boyacá es para Vivirla

 Director Deportivo: Vicente Belda

Alc. Armenia y Pereira

 Director Deportivo: Alejandro Carrizoza

Gobernación Nariño-Alkosto

 Director Deportivo: Remigio Atapuma

Cicloases

 Director Deportivo: Marcos Goyes

Estudiantes de Tunja

See also 
 2009 Clásico RCN

References 
 cyclingnews
 cyclingwebsite
 dailypeloton

Vuelta a Colombia
Colombia
Vuelta Colombia